Alexei Kosygin's second government lasted four years, until the 1970 Soviet election held on 14 June. Many new ministries were created under it.

The former government of Alexei Kosygin was dissolved following the Soviet legislative election of 1966. Kosygin was once again elected Premier by the Politburo and the Central Committee following the election.

Ministries

Committees

References 
General

Government of the Soviet Union > List
 

Specific

Soviet governments
1966 establishments in the Soviet Union
1970 disestablishments
Era of Stagnation